The following elections took place in 1844:

North America

US federal elections 
 1844 United States presidential election
 1844 United States House of Representatives elections
 1844 United States Senate elections

US state elections 
 1844 Missouri gubernatorial election
 1844 Pennsylvania gubernatorial election

Republic of Texas 
 1844 Republic of Texas presidential election

Europe 
 1844 Greek legislative election
 1844 Icelandic parliamentary election
 1844 Norwegian parliamentary election